Myrteae is the largest tribe in the plant family Myrtaceae. It includes most of the species of the family that have fleshy fruits. 

Well-known members include edible fruit such as feijoa (Feijoa sellowiana), guava (Psidium guajava), jabuticaba (Plinia cauliflora), Surinam cherry (Eugenia uniflora), strawberry guava (Psidium cattleyanum), camu camu (Myrciaria dubia), arazá (Eugenia stipitata), and rumberry (Myrciaria floribunda). The tribe also includes many plants grown for their ornamental value, including common myrtle (Myrtus communis), temu (Luma apiculata), ugniberry (Ugni molinae), and rose myrtle (Rhodomyrtus tomentosa) and common spices such as allspice (Pimenta dioica).

Genera

References

Rosid tribes
Myrtaceae
Taxa named by Augustin Pyramus de Candolle